Mulli (Quechua for Peruvian pepper tree, also spelled Molle) is a mountain in the Cordillera Central in the Andes of Peru, about  high. It lies in the Lima Region, Huarochirí Province, San Damian District. It is situated on a ridge southwest of Utush Mikhunan is situated northwest of Uqhu and Suyruqucha.

References

Mountains of Peru
Mountains of Lima Region